Wonderful Life is a soundtrack album by Cliff Richard with The Shadows to the 1964 film Wonderful Life. It is their third film soundtrack album and Richard's eleventh album overall. The album reached number 2 in the UK Albums Chart, spending 8 weeks in the top 3 and 23 weeks on in the top 20, but was a marked decline from their previous soundtrack album Summer Holiday that had spent 14 weeks at number 1.

The album had two lead singles, the first being the instrumental "Theme for Young Lovers" from the Shadows, followed by "On the Beach" with Richard being backed by the Shadows.

Curiously, some of the recordings on the album are not those used on the actual film soundtrack, including the title song. The vocal takes are different and in some cases the orchestrations are also altered slightly. The recordings on the album are generally more polished than the soundtrack ones. The Shadows' recording line-up included Brian Locking on bass guitar although by the time filming commenced John Rostill had replaced him.

The vinyl LP released on the Columbia label in the UK featured an inner sleeve with a storyline outlining the plot and the position of each of the musical numbers, illustrated with stills from the film.

Released in the US with the title Swingers Paradise the album did not chart.

Track listing
"Wonderful Life" (Bennett/Welch) - Cliff Richard and A.B.S. Orchestra 
"A Girl in Every Port" (Myers/Cass) - Cliff Richard, and A.B.S. Orchestra
"Walkin'" (Hank Marvin/Welch) - The Shadows 
"A Little Imagination" (Myers/Cass) - Cliff Richard and A.B.S. Orchestra
"Home" - Cliff Richard and A.B.S. Orchestra
"On the Beach" (Marvin/Richard/Welch)  - Cliff Richard and The Shadows
"In the Stars" (Myers/Cass) - Cliff Richard and A.B.S. Orchestra
"We Love a Movie" (Myers/Cass) - Cliff Richard and A.B.S. Orchestra 
"Do You Remember" (Marvin/Welch) - Cliff Richard, The Shadows, and The Norrie Paramor Strings 
"What've I Gotta Do" (Marvin/Welch) - Cliff Richard and The Shadows  
"Theme for Young Lovers" (Welch) - The Shadows 
"All Kinds of People" (Myers/Cass) - Cliff Richard and A.B.S. Orchestra
"A Matter of Moments" (Welch) - Cliff Richard, The Shadows, and The Norrie Paramor Strings 
"Youth and Experience" (Myers/Cass) - Cliff Richard and A.B.S. Orchestra

Personnel
Cliff Richard with the Shadows
Cliff Richard – lead vocals
Hank Marvin – lead guitar
Bruce Welch – rhythm guitar
Brian Locking – bass guitar
Brian Bennett – drums

Chart performance

References

External links
http://www.cliffandshads.co.uk/ Cliff Richard discography

Musical film soundtracks
Cliff Richard albums
The Shadows albums
1964 soundtrack albums
EMI Columbia Records soundtracks